The 1935–36 Kansas Jayhawks men's basketball team represented the University of Kansas during the 1935–36 college men's basketball season.

Roster
Marvin Cox
Roy Holliday
Fred Pralle
Ray Ebling
Lester Kappelman
Raymond Noble
Wilmer Shaffer
Paul Rogers
Robert Holmer
Milton Allen

Schedule

References

Kansas Jayhawks men's basketball seasons
Kansas
Kansas
Kansas